Balsam Lake may refer to:

Canada
Balsam Lake (Ontario), a lake in the Kawartha lakes region 
Balsam Lake Provincial Park, on the above lake

United States
Minnesota
Balsam Lake (Itasca County, Minnesota)

New York
Balsam Lake (New York), a man-made lake in Chenango County
Balsam Lake Mountain, part of the Catskill Mountains
Balsam Lake Mountain Fire Observation Station, on the above mountain

Wisconsin
Balsam Lake (Wisconsin), a lake in Polk County
Balsam Lake (town), Wisconsin, a town in Polk County
Balsam Lake, Wisconsin, in the above town